The Federal Reserve Bank of Richmond Charlotte Branch Office is one of the two Federal Reserve Bank of Richmond branch offices. Established in 1927, The Federal Reserve Bank of Richmond's Charlotte Branch is an operational and regional center for the Carolinas, including the nation's second largest financial center in Charlotte, North Carolina. They promote the safety and soundness of large bank holding companies headquartered in Charlotte. They distribute currency and coin to financial institutions in our region and provide check adjustment services for the Federal Reserve System. Their public programs include forums and conferences, economic education outreach, tours and a speakers’ bureau.

History 
Established on December 1, 1927, the Charlotte Branch was located on the 20th floor of the First National Bank Building. It was setup to primarily serve the industrial Piedmont region of North and South Carolina; in its first full year of operation in 1928, the Charlotte Branch handled nearly 6.6 million checks worth almost $1.7 billion and received and shipped over $40 million in currency. On January 20, 1942, the Charlotte Branch relocated into a new three-story, ancient-style (a blending of Art Moderne, Art Deco, and Neoclassical architecture) building located at 401 South Tryon Street. In 1955-56, two stories were added to the building, as well as a rectangular rear extension. By 1970, the Charlotte Branch acquired an adjacent building and added a second-story enclosed walkway to link the buildings together.

In 1985, the Charlotte Branch moved to its third and current location at 530 East Trade Street. The five-story, modernist building, includes a three-story underground vault encased in steel used for currency storage and exchange. In 2009, check-processing operations at the Charlotte Branch were discontinued as the system was transferred to electronic check-clearing; leaving only currency storage, exchange, and shredding operations.

Board of Directors
The following people are on the board of directors as of 2022:

Appointed by the Federal Reserve Bank

Appointed by the Board of Governors

Past members
 Jeff Kane, to retire on March 1, will be replaced by Matthew Martin
 Matthew Martin, Senior Vice President and Charlotte Regional Executive
 Linda L. Dolny
 James H. Speed, Jr.

See also

 Federal Reserve Act
 Federal Reserve System
 Federal Reserve Districts
 Federal Reserve Branches
 Federal Reserve Bank of Richmond
 Federal Reserve Bank of Richmond Baltimore Branch Office

References

External links
 Federal Reserve Bank of Richmond Charlotte Branch Office

Federal Reserve branches
Buildings and structures in Charlotte, North Carolina